Sergei Rybin (born December 11, 1979) is a Russian former professional ice hockey player.

Rybin played 17 seasons in Russia with the HC Lipetsk and HC Ryazan. He retired  following the 2013–14 season.

Career statistics

References

https://www.eliteprospects.com/player/162554/sergei-rybin

1979 births
Russian ice hockey forwards
Living people
HC Lipetsk players
HC Ryazan players
Sportspeople from Lipetsk